The Nescafé Extra Challenge was a non-ranking snooker tournament held in Bangkok, Thailand for two editions with a year's break in between. It involved four players playing each other on a round-robin format with the winner decided on a league basis.

The first tournament was played in 1991, with Joe Johnson taking the title by winning all three of his matches. The event was not played the following season, but returned in 1993, with Ronnie O'Sullivan winning the tournament and collecting his first professional title.

Winners

References

Snooker non-ranking competitions
Recurring sporting events established in 1991
Recurring events disestablished in 1993
Defunct snooker competitions